This is a list of transfers in Dutch football for the 2010 Winter transfer window. Only moves featuring an Eredivisie side and/or an Eerste Divisie side are listed.

The winter transfer window will open on January 1, 2009, and will close on February 2. Deals may be signed at any given moment in the season, but the actual transfer may only take place during the transfer window. Unattached players may sign at any moment.

HFC Haarlem was declared bankrupt on 25 January 2010, so all the players can move freely, outside of the transfer periode, to another club.

Eredivisie

ADO Den Haag

In:

.
.

Out:

AFC Ajax

In:

Out:

AZ

In:

Out:

Feyenoord

In:

Out:

FC Groningen

In:

Out:

SC Heerenveen

In:

Out:

Heracles

In:

Out:

NAC

In:

Out:

NEC

In:

Out:

PSV

In:

Out:

RKC Waalwijk

In:

Out:

Roda JC

In:

Out:

Sparta

In:

Out:

FC Twente

In:

Out:

FC Utrecht

In:

Out:

Vitesse

In:

Out:

VVV

In:

Out:

Willem II

In:

Out:

Eerste Divisie

AGOVV

In:

Out:

SC Cambuur

In:

Out:

FC Den Bosch

In:

Out:

FC Dordrecht

In:

Out:

FC Eindhoven

In:

Out:

FC Emmen

In:

Out:

Excelsior

In:

Out:

Fortuna Sittard

In:

Out:

Go Ahead Eagles

In:

Out:

De Graafschap

In:

Out:

HFC Haarlem

In:

Out:

Helmond Sport

In:

Out:

MVV

In:

Out:

FC Omniworld

In:

Out:

FC Oss

In:

Out:

RBC

In:

Out:

Telstar

In:

Out:

BV Veendam

In:

Out:

FC Volendam

In:

Out:

FC Zwolle

In:

Out:

References

2009-10 Winter
Football transfers winter
Dutch